Al-Madain Sport Club, is an Iraqi football team based in Baghdad, that plays in the Iraq Division Three.

History
Al-Madain team played in the Iraqi Premier League qualifiers in the 2000–01 season for the first time in its history in the Baghdad Group 1. The team was not ready, it won one match, drew one match, lost all their other matches, and came to the bottom of the group standings, and their match against Al-Zawraa recorded one of the largest results in Iraqi football history when they lost 11–1.

See also
 2000–01 Iraqi Elite League
 2001–02 Iraq FA Cup

References

External links
 Al-Madain SC on Goalzz.com
 Iraq Clubs- Foundation Dates

1996 establishments in Iraq
Association football clubs established in 1996
Football clubs in Baghdad